Music from The Connection is a jazz album by trumpeter Howard McGhee recorded on June 13, 1960, and released on the Felsted label. It features performances by McGhee, Tina Brooks, Freddie Redd, Milt Hinton and Osie Johnson.  The album featured music from the off-Broadway play The Connection by Jack Gelber, featuring music composed by Redd. A slightly earlier recording of the same score by the Freddie Redd Quartet with Jackie McLean, The Music From "The Connection", was issued by Blue Note.

Track listing 
All compositions by Freddie Redd

Side-A
 "Who Killed Cock Robin?" - 4:25
 "Wigglin'" - 4:52
 "Music Forever" - 3:46
 "Time to Smile" - 3:53
Side-B
 "(Theme for) Sister Salvation" - 4:36
 "Jim Dunn's Dilemma" - 3:57
 "O.D. (Overdose)" - 3:42

Personnel 
 Howard McGhee - trumpet
 Freddie Redd - piano (originally credited to "I. Ching")
 Tina Brooks - tenor saxophone
 Milt Hinton - bass
 Osie Johnson - drums

References 

1960 albums
Howard McGhee albums
Felsted Records albums